Anne Therese Gallagher  is the President of the International Catholic Migration Commission and the Director-General of the Commonwealth Foundation, the intergovernmental arm of the Commonwealth charged with supporting civil society throughout its 53 member states. An Australian born lawyer, practitioner and scholar, she is considered to be an international authority on transnational criminal law, migration and human rights and, according to the 2012 Trafficking in Persons Report prepared by the United States Department of State, is 'the leading global expert on the international law on human trafficking’.

Education 
As an undergraduate Gallagher studied at Macquarie University, Sydney, graduating with a Bachelor of Arts (Political Science and International Relations) in 1984 and a Bachelor of Laws in 1987. She completed a Master of International Law at the Australian National University in 1991. In 2006 Gallagher obtained a Doctor of Philosophy from the University of Utrecht, Netherlands.

Career history 
Gallagher was educated in Sydney at Santa Sabina College and studied at both Macquarie University and the Australian National University. She was admitted as a solicitor of the Supreme Court of New South Wales in 1988 and as a barrister and solicitor of the High Court of Australia in 1988 and of the Supreme Court of the Australian Capital Territory in 1990.

From 1990 to 1992 Gallagher was a lecturer in the Australian National University's Graduate International Law Program.

She is a former United Nations Official (1992–2003) and was Adviser to Mary Robinson, the United Nations High Commissioner for Human Rights, from 1998 to 2002. During her tenure as Adviser, Gallagher represented Mary Robinson at the negotiations for the United Nations Convention against Transnational Organized Crime as well as its protocols on trafficking and migrant smuggling. In 2001–2002 she led the development of the United Nations Principles and Guidelines on Human Rights and Human Trafficking and during that same period was the founding Chair of the United Nations Inter-Agency Group on Human Trafficking and Migrant Smuggling.

From 2003 to 2018, held various leadership positions in a high profile and sensitive regional development initiative, funded by the Australian Government's International Aid Program  aimed at strengthening legislative and criminal justice responses to trafficking in persons and related exploitation in all ten Association of Southeast Asian Nations (ASEAN) Member States. The US State Department cited Gallagher's contribution to this Project, which they note has been 'widely acclaimed for its positive impact on laws, policies and practices within and outside the Association of Southeast Asian Nations (ASEAN) region'. The ASEAN Secretary-General, Dr Surin Pitsuwan, also noted Gallagher's contribution, stating that: 'Dr Gallagher's expertise in this field, particularly in the area of criminal justice responses to trafficking, is recognised and deeply appreciated throughout the ASEAN region. ... It is not wrong to say that the achievements that ASEAN, as a region, is enjoying in the criminal justice response to the heinous crime of trafficking are in no small part due to Dr Gallagher's persevering efforts and her compassion towards ASEAN.'

Gallagher is also an independent, self-funded scholar with a compelling research and publications record on areas related to human rights, criminal justice and the rule of law, and the international law on human trafficking. In addition to numerous articles in major journals, including the International Criminal Justice Review, Human Rights Quarterly, Virginia Journal of International Law and the Anti-Trafficking Review, Gallagher is the author of The International Law of Human Trafficking published by Cambridge University Press and awarded the 2011 American Society of International Law Certificate of Merit – Honorable Mention. She is also the lead author of the companion volume "The International Law of Migrant Smuggling" published by Cambridge University Press and described, by the American Journal of International Law, as "a tour de force"

A frequent panellist, expert and rapporteur at international and national governmental and non-governmental consultations, meetings, workshops and other fora, Gallagher has also been invited to be a guest speaker and lecturer at universities around the world, and commented for, or cited by, media. She frequently contributes opinion pieces to mainstream outlets including The Guardian and the World Economic Forum. Gallagher is also a regular, critical commentator on the annual US State Department Trafficking in Persons Report, and has been openly scathing of related efforts to quantify the problem of 'modern slavery' and assess national responses. Gallagher has reported being threatened with legal action following her criticism, in the Huffington Post, of "a US-based organization that stages high profile, ethically compromised 'rescue' operations in impoverished countries". Since 2014, Gallagher has been a semi-regular contributor to The Spectator magazine, writing on a range of topics including the United Nations, freedom of speech, and migration.

Gallagher continued to advise the United Nations after her formal departure. Outputs included the commentary to the United Nations Recommended Principles and Guidelines on Human Rights and Human Trafficking and a series of legal issue papers produced by the United Nations Office on Drugs and Crime: Abuse of a position of vulnerability and other “means” within the definition of trafficking in persons; "The role of "consent" in the trafficking in persons Protocol "; "The concept of exploitation in the trafficking in persons Protocol"; "The Concept of Financial or other Material Benefit in the Smuggling of Migrants Protocol" and "The International Legal Definition of Trafficking in Persons: consolidation of research findings and reflection on issues raised".

Recognition, awards and appointments 
Gallagher was the recipient of the Anti-Slavery Australia Freedom Award in 2011. In June 2012 she was appointed Officer of the Order of Australia (AO), that country's second-highest civic honour. This appointment was made for her: 'distinguished service to the law, and to human rights, as a practitioner, teacher and scholar, particularly in the areas of human trafficking responses and criminal justice.' Also in June 2012, she was named a "2012 TIP Report Hero" by the United States Government for her work in the global fight against human trafficking.

Gallagher has been appointed to a number of formal advisory positions. In 2014 she commenced as co-chair of the International Bar Association's Presidential Task Force on Human Trafficking. Also in 2014 she was appointed to the International Migration Organization's Migration Advisory Board, convened by its Director-General, William Lacey Swing. In 2016 Gallagher joined Doughty Street Chambers - one of the largest civil liberties legal firms in the world – as an Academic Expert. She is also a founding member of the Asia Dialogue on Forced Migration.

Presidency of the International Catholic Migration Commission

In March 2018, Gallagher was elected President of the International Catholic Migration Commission, succeeding former Goldman Sachs Chairman and UN Special Representative on migration Sir Peter Sutherland. Gallagher is the first woman president since the commission's founding in 1951 and is currently the only woman heading a Vatican-affiliated organisation. the first woman to take this role since the commission's founding in 1951. In her public pronouncements as president, Gallagher has called for an "honest dialogue" on migration to confront the "globalization of indifference".

Director-General of the Commonwealth Foundation

In June 2019 Gallagher was appointed Director-General of the Commonwealth Foundation by its 46 Member States,  becoming the first women to occupy this post in the Foundation's 70-year history. She is expected to serve two three-year terms.

References

Australian women lawyers
Australian women academics
Australian human rights activists
Women human rights activists
Australian women activists
Living people
Year of birth missing (living people)
Anti–human trafficking activists
International criminal law scholars
Australian National University alumni
Macquarie University alumni
Utrecht University alumni
Australian officials of the United Nations
Officers of the Order of Australia